The Finnish Business School Graduates, founded in 1935, is a central organization for graduates and students in economics and business administration. It consists of 25 regional associations and 13 student societies. The association has over 50,000 members, graduate members, and over 15,000 students. Its graduate members from Finnish universities have a B.Sc. (Econ. Bus. & Adm.) or M.Sc. (Econ. Bus. & Adm.) degree. Applications from foreign university graduates are assessed individually. A member must have at least academic bachelor's-level degree (e.g. BA, BSc) in business studies. Many of its members are working outside Finland. The Finnish Business School Graduates attempts to improve the success of its members as individuals. To do so, it implements several services concerning educational, professional, social issues and labour market conditions, and always according to the needs of the members. On behalf of its members, it negotiates and concludes collective agreements concerning salaries and conditions of employment.
The association is the fourth biggest affiliate of AKAVA (the Confederation of Unions for Professional and Managerial Staff in Finland).

History 

From 1924 onwards, small business school graduate associations and societies were founded to the largest cities in Finland. The Finnish Business School Graduates' predecessor was the Swedish Business School (Hanken) alumni association Ekonomföreningen Niord. The follower, Ekonomiyhdistys ry, was founded in 1935. In 1951, ten associations joined together to create Ekonomiliitto, the Finnish Association of Business School Graduates. In 1973, members and associations of the Swedish speaking Ekonomförbund rf joined the umbrella organization. In summer 2014, the association changed its name into Suomen Ekonomit - Finlands Ekonomer - The Finnish Business School Graduates.

In the beginning, the main function of the associations was to convey job opportunities to graduated members. It was all about networking and socializing. Later on, the functions have evolved towards wider approach on issues regarding employment relations; Salary surveys, legal advice, career guidance and training.

Associations social policy and labor market representation
Finnish employment relation model is based on relatively high level of collective bargaining in relation to local wage settlements. For the white collar workers, collective bargaining in the Finnish model is based on strong professional unions and their collaborations. The main interest representation function is to produce and negotiate industry level collective bargaining agreements together with other unions in Akava and collective negotiation organizations.

Associations policy is to guarantee decent wage development throughout the industry, ensure proper conditions in employment contracts and promote wellbeing at the workplace. Promoting equality and the general knowledge of labor market development among members and the public is also essential.
The education policy occurs in coordination with universities, member organizations, student organizations, social organizations and political parties. The goal is to maintain the esteem and quality of business education at the academic level and the graduates’ expertise.

The organisation 

Federal assembly holds the highest quorum in the decision making of The Finnish Business School Graduates. It convenes at least twice in a year. Members to the assembly are selected by member organizations. The board consists of 9–12 members and they are responsible for the planning, monitoring, and important decisions. Term of office for the members of the board is 3 years. The student representative in the board changes yearly.
The acting chairman of the board is Timo Saranpää. Executive director is Anja Uljas and the director lobby and interest representation is Riku Salokannel.

References

External links 
 

Student societies in Finland